At Christmas is the eighth studio album and first full-length Christmas album by American country music artist Sara Evans. It was released on November 17, 2014 via RCA Nashville. The physical copy of the album was released exclusively through Walmart stores.

Content
The album features a selection of well-known classic Christmas songs and one original song, the title track, written by Shane Stevens and Toby Lightman. "The Twelve Days of Christmas" features vocals from two of Evans' daughters, Olivia and Audrey. The final three tracks were recorded and released previously on various artist albums: "O Come All Ye Faithful" was featured on Country Christmas 1999, "Go Tell It on the Mountain" on Country Christmas 2001 and "I'll Be Home for Christmas" on Hear Something Country: Christmas 2007. The tracks were first compiled together for a digital EP release in 2009, entitled I'll Be Home for Christmas.

Track listing

Charts

References

2014 Christmas albums
Christmas albums by American artists
Country Christmas albums
Sara Evans albums
RCA Records Christmas albums
Albums produced by Mark Bright (record producer)
Albums produced by Norro Wilson
Albums produced by John Shanks
Albums produced by Patrick Leonard
Albums produced by Buddy Cannon